Peter Devine may refer to:

 Peter Devine (footballer) (born 1960), English footballer
 Peter Devine (fencer) (born 1976), American fencer